Höchberg is a municipality in the district of Würzburg in Bavaria, Germany. Höchberg borders, in the east, directly on the city of Würzburg. Höchberg consists of two main urban areas: Altort and Hexenbruch. Residential construction areas have been added in recent years, for example "Mehle" 
and " Mehle II".

History

The earliest recorded official reference to Höchberg dates from 748.

Jewish families resided in Höchberg at least since the late 1600s. They established a Jewish cemetery and erected a synagogue in 1721, which was plundered in the November pogrom in 1938 by SA members. Since 1951, the building has served as a Protestant church. Today, a plaque at the church entry and a monument at the Jewish cemetery commemorate these facts.

Notable residents
 Kurt Pompe (1899–1964), Nazi SS concentration camp commandant

References

Würzburg (district)
Holocaust locations in Germany